Macrogomphus wynaadicus is a species of dragonfly in the family Gomphidae. It is endemic to the Western Ghats of India.

Description and habitat
It is a medium-sized dragonfly with its thorax black, having two thick yellow ante-humeral stripes. Abdomen is black, marked with citron-yellow paired spots. Segment 2 has a dorsal stripe broken at its centre. Segment 3 has a large base-lateral dorsal spot. Segments 4 to 6 have similar, but smaller spots. Segment 7 has the basal half marked with yellow. Segments 8 and 9 have baso-lateral triangular spots. Segment 8 is very broad, segment 9 is tapering from base to apex, and nearly as long as segments 7 and 8 together as peculiar in genus Macrogomphus.

It looks very similar to Macrogomphus annulatus; but can be distinguished by the paired spots on abdominal segments 3 to 6 instead of complete rings.

The species is found in forested streams where it breeds.

See also
 List of odonates of India
 List of odonata of Kerala

References

Gomphidae
Taxa named by Frederic Charles Fraser
Insects described in 1924